Terrel Andre Harris (born August 10, 1987) is an American former professional basketball player who last played for Maccabi Ashdod of the Israeli Super League.

High school and college
Harris attended South Garland High School in Garland, Texas, where he was unanimously voted District 11-5A MVP and also voted 1st team All State as a senior. He played college basketball at Oklahoma State University from 2005–09 and majored in education. He appeared in 134 career games and averaged 9.8 points per game, 4.0 rebounds per game, 1.5 assists per game, and 1.3 steals per game in 26.4 minutes per game. He shot 43.9 percent from the field, 36.3 percent from three-point range and 81.5 percent from the free throw line. He averaged 14 points and 5 rebounds in 32 minutes per game during his senior year while starting all 35 games.  He also received an All–Big 12 Honorable Mention and was named to the Big 12 All–Defensive Team.

Professional
Not selected in the 2009 NBA draft, Harris began his professional career in France with Strasbourg IG, signing with the team on August 23, 2009. In nine games, Harris averaged 6.8 points, 1.9 rebounds, 1.7 assists, and 1.11 steals and made 37.5% of field goal attempts. On January 7, 2010, Harris signed with the Maine Red Claws of the NBA Development League; the Red Claws waived Harris in March 2010. By the end of March 2010, Harris signed with the D-League team Rio Grande Valley Vipers. In September and October 2011, Harris played with EnBW Ludwigsburg of Basketball Bundesliga in Germany.

After beginning the 2011–12 season with the Vipers, Harris was invited to the Miami Heat's training camp on December 12, 2011. On December 24, 2011, it was officially announced that Harris had made the Heat's final roster. On January 5, 2012, against the Atlanta Hawks, Harris posted a career-high 14 rebounds along with 9 points. On April 6, 2012, Harris scored a career-high 10 points against the Memphis Grizzlies. Harris won an NBA championship with the Heat on June 21, 2012.

On July 4, 2012, the Heat declined to extend a qualifying offer to Harris, making him an unrestricted free agent. He was re-signed by the Heat on September 11, 2012. The Heat waived him on January 5, 2013. After being waived by the Heat, he was re-acquired by the Vipers.

On March 5, 2013, Harris was traded to the Erie BayHawks.

On March 8, 2013, Harris signed a ten-day contract with the New Orleans Hornets. He signed a second ten-day contract on March 18, and signed for the remainder of the season on March 28. In April 2013, the Hornets were renamed the Pelicans.

On July 10, 2013, the Pelicans sent Harris and teammate Robin Lopez to the Portland Trail Blazers as part of a three-way trade that also involved the Sacramento Kings.

Harris was waived by the Trail Blazers on September 23, 2013.

On October 31, 2013, he was acquired by the Erie BayHawks. On November 4, 2013, he was traded to the Texas Legends. On February 20, 2014, he was traded to the Bakersfield Jam.

On August 22, 2014, Harris signed with Maccabi Ashdod of Israel for the 2014–15 season.

Personal life
Harris has two siblings: a brother, Kendal, a top-rated point guard in the 2013 class, and a sister, Tresa. His mother is Jackie Harris. While in college at Oklahoma State, Harris majored in education. He wears size 13 sneakers.

NBA career statistics

Regular season

|-
|style="text-align:left;background:#afe6ba;"|†
| style="text-align:left;"| Miami
| 22 || 1 || 14.5 || .349 || .205 || .667 || 2.3 || 1.2 || .4 || .1 || 3.6
|-
| style="text-align:left;"| 
| style="text-align:left;"| Miami
| 7 || 0 || 4.1 || .250 || .000 || .750 || 1.3 || .3 || .0 || .0 || 1.4
|-
| style="text-align:left;"| 
| style="text-align:left;"| New Orleans
| 13 || 0 || 8.3 || .105 || .000 || .500 || 1.3 || .5 || .2 || .2 || .4
|-
| style="text-align:left;"| Career
| style="text-align:left;"| 
| 42 || 1 || 10.8 || .300 || .170 || .677 || 1.8 || .8 || .3 || .1 || 2.3

Playoffs

|-
|style="text-align:left;background:#afe6ba;"|2012†
| style="text-align:left;"| Miami
| 4 || 0 || 2.5 || .500 || .000 || .750 || .8 || .0 || .0 || .0 || 1.3
|-
| style="text-align:left;"| Career
| style="text-align:left;"| 
| 4 || 0 || 2.5 || .500 || .000 || .750 || .8 || .0 || .0 || .0 || 1.3

References

External links
Oklahoma State Cowboys bio
NBA D-League Profile

1987 births
Living people
American expatriate basketball people in France
American expatriate basketball people in Germany
American expatriate basketball people in Israel
American men's basketball players
Bakersfield Jam players
Basketball players from Dallas
Maccabi Ashdod B.C. players
Maine Red Claws players
Riesen Ludwigsburg players
Miami Heat players
New Orleans Hornets players
Oklahoma State Cowboys basketball players
People from Garland, Texas
Rio Grande Valley Vipers players
Shooting guards
SIG Basket players
Texas Legends players
Undrafted National Basketball Association players